Sir Trevor Robert Nunn  (born 14 January 1940) is a British theatre director. He has been the Artistic Director for the Royal Shakespeare Company, the Royal National Theatre, and, currently, the Theatre Royal, Haymarket. He has directed dramas for the stage, like Macbeth, as well as opera and musicals, such as Cats (1981) and Les Misérables (1985).

Nunn has been nominated for the Tony Award for Best Direction of a Musical, the Tony Award for Best Direction of a Play, the Laurence Olivier Award for Best Director, and the Drama Desk Award for Outstanding Director of a Musical, winning Tonys for Cats, Les Misérables, and Nicholas Nickleby and the Olivier Awards for productions of Summerfolk, The Merchant of Venice, Troilus and Cressida, and Nicholas Nickleby. In 2008 The Telegraph named him among the most influential people in British culture. He has also directed works for film and television.

Early years 
Nunn was born in Ipswich, England, to Robert Alexander Nunn, a cabinetmaker, and Dorothy May Piper. As a small boy he loved reading but his parents had little money for books. However an aunt had more books, including a complete Shakespeare which he read whenever the family visited her. In the end she gave it to him.

He was educated at Northgate Grammar School, Ipswich and Downing College, Cambridge. At Northgate, he had an inspiring English teacher, Peter Hewett, who also directed the school plays. Hewett encouraged him to sit the scholarship exam in Cambridge in the hope of studying under F. R. Leavis at Downing. Hewett also persuaded the headmaster to help with the cost of Nunn staying in Cambridge to take the exam. Nunn's father could not afford it and the headmaster had refused at first so Nunn was close to giving up. At Downing, Nunn began his stage career and first met contemporaries Ian McKellen and Derek Jacobi. In 1962, he directed Macbeth for The Marlowe Society and he directed that year's Footlights. He also won a Director's Scholarship, becoming a trainee director at the Belgrade Theatre in Coventry.

Career 
In 1964, Nunn joined the Royal Shakespeare Company and in 1968 he was appointed Artistic Director of the RSC, a position he held until 1986 (latterly with Terry Hands from 1978).

His first wife, Janet Suzman, appeared in many of his productions, such as the 1974 televised version of his Antony and Cleopatra. Nunn directed the RSC production of Macbeth starring Ian McKellen in the title role and Dame Judi Dench as Lady Macbeth in 1976. Nunn staged the action of the drama with not only the paying audience, but also the audience of all of the actors in the production not in the ongoing scene—they sat on wooden crates just beyond the main playing space.

Nunn became a leading figure in theatrical circles, and was responsible for many significant productions, such as the RSC's version of Dickens's Nicholas Nickleby, co-directed with John Caird, and a 1976 musical adaptation of the Shakespeare play The Comedy of Errors.

A very successful director of musicals, in the non-subsidised sector, Nunn directed the musical Cats (1981), formerly the longest running musical in Broadway's history, and the first English production of Les Misérables in 1985, also with John Caird, which has been running continuously in London since opening. Nunn also directed the little-known 1986 Webber–Rice musical Cricket, at Windsor Castle. Besides Cats and Les Misérables Nunn's other musical credits include Starlight Express and Sunset Boulevard. He became Artistic Director of the Royal National Theatre in September 1997, a position he retained until 2003.

Later London credits include My Fair Lady, South Pacific (at the Royal National Theatre), The Woman in White, Othello and Acorn Antiques: The Musical! (2005), The Royal Hunt of the Sun, Rock 'n' Roll and Porgy and Bess in 2006 at the Savoy Theatre (an abridged version with dialogue instead of recitatives, unlike Nunn's first production of the opera).

He directed We Happy Few, a play by his second wife Imogen Stubbs, in 2004. Stubbs often appears in his productions, including the 1996 Twelfth Night film. Nunn directed a modern production of Shakespeare's Hamlet in 2004, which starred Ben Whishaw in the title role, and Imogen Stubbs as Gertrude, and was staged at the Old Vic Theatre in London.

In 2007, he directed the RSC productions of King Lear and The Seagull, which played at Stratford before embarking on a world tour (including the Brooklyn Academy of Music) and then playing at the New London Theatre from November 2007. The two plays both starred Ian McKellen, Romola Garai, Frances Barber, Sylvester McCoy, and William Gaunt. Nunn's television production of King Lear was screened on Boxing Day, 2008 with McKellen in the title role.

In 2008, he returned to The Belgrade Theatre in Coventry (the theatre where he started his career) to direct Joanna Murray-Smith's adaptation of Ingmar Bergman's film Scenes from a Marriage starring Imogen Stubbs and Iain Glen. His musical adaptation of Gone with the Wind opened at the New London Theatre in April 2008 and, after poor reviews, closed on 14 June 2008 after 79 performances. In December 2008, he directed a revival of A Little Night Music at the Menier Chocolate Factory, which transferred to the West End at the Garrick Theatre in 2009. The production transferred to Broadway, opening in November 2009, with Catherine Zeta-Jones as Desiree Armfeldt and Angela Lansbury as Madame Armfeldt. Other members of the original London cast also transferred with the production. The production closed in January 2011 after 425 performances.

In 2010, Nunn directed a revival of the Andrew Lloyd Webber musical Aspects of Love from July to September 2010 at the Menier Chocolate Factory and the play Birdsong, which opened in September 2010 at the Comedy Theatre, based on the Sebastian Faulks novel of the same title.

Nunn marked his debut as Artistic Director of the Theatre Royal, Haymarket, with a revival of Flare Path (as part of the playwright, Terence Rattigan's, centenary year celebrations). The production, starring Sienna Miller, James Purefoy and Sheridan Smith, opened in March 2011 and closed in June 2011, and was followed by productions of Rosencrantz and Guildenstern Are Dead, (June – August 2011) and The Tempest, starring Ralph Fiennes (September – October 2011). His final production at the Haymarket, The Lion in Winter (November 2011 – January 2012), starred Joanna Lumley and Robert Lindsay.

Nunn returned to the Haymarket in 2014 to direct the play Fatal Attraction.

For Christmas 2018, Nunn directed a revival of Fiddler on the Roof at the Menier Chocolate Factory, before transferring to the Playhouse Theatre in London's West End for a limited season in spring 2019. The production starred Andy Nyman as Tevye and Judy Kuhn as Golde.

In 2020, he was due to direct a new musical Identical based on The Parent Trap. It was due to have its world premiere at the Nottingham Playhouse before transferring to the Theatre Royal, Bath over the summer of 2020. However, due to the COVID-19 pandemic in the United Kingdom, the production has been delayed until 2021.

Film and opera 
Nunn has directed opera at Glyndebourne. He re-staged his highly successful Glyndebourne production of Gershwin's Porgy and Bess for television in 1993, and was highly praised.

He has directed for film, including Lady Jane (1986), Hedda, an adaptation of Hedda Gabler, and a 1996 film version of Shakespeare's Twelfth Night.

Personal life 
Nunn has been married three times and has five children. He was married to actress Janet Suzman from 17 October 1969 until their divorce in 1986. They have one son, Joshua. From 1986 until their 1991 divorce, he was married to Sharon Lee-Hill, with whom he has two children, Laurie and Amy.

In 1994, he married actress Imogen Stubbs with whom he has two children, Ellie and Jesse. In April 2011 Stubbs announced their separation.

Nunn was in a brief relationship with Nancy Dell'Olio in 2011.

In 1998 Nunn was named in a list of the biggest private financial donors to the Labour Party. In 2002, he was knighted.

In 2014, Nunn told The Telegraph that Shakespeare was his religion. "Shakespeare has more wisdom and insight about our lives, about how to live and how not to live, how to forgive and how to understand our fellow creatures, than any religious tract. One hundred times more than the Bible. I'm sorry to say that. But over and over again in the plays there is an understanding of the human condition that doesn't exist in religious books".

Credits

Broadway 
Source: Internet Broadway Database
Cats – 31 July 2016 – 30 December 2017
A Little Night Music – 13 December 2009 – 11 January 2011
 Rock 'n' Roll – 4 November 2007 – 9 March 2008
 Les Misérables (revival) – 9 November 2006 – 6 January 2008
 The Woman in White – 17 November 2005 – 19 February 2006
 Chess – 22 September 2003 (Benefit Concert)
 Vincent in Brixton (as original producer) – 6 March 2003 – 4 May 2003
 Oklahoma! – 21 March 2002 – 23 February 2003
 Noises Off (as original producer) – 1 November 2001 – 1 September 2002
 Rose written by Martin Sherman (as original producer) – 12 April 2000 – 20 May 2000
 Copenhagen (as original producer) – 11 April 2000 – 21 January 2001
 Amy's View (as original producer) – 15 April 1999 – 18 July 1999
 Closer (as original producer) – 25 March 1999 – 22 August 1999
 Not About Nightingales – 25 February 1999 – 13 June 1999
 Arcadia – 30 March 1995 – 27 August 1995
 Sunset Boulevard – 17 November 1994 – 22 March 1997
 Aspects of Love – 8 April 1990 – 2 March 1991
 Chess – 28 April 1988 – 25 June 1988
 Starlight Express – 15 March 1987 – 8 January 1989
 Les Misérables – 12 March 1987 – 18 May 2003
 The Life and Adventures of Nicholas Nickleby – 24 August 1986 – 12 October 1986
 André De Shields' Harlem Nocturne (Featuring songs with lyrics by Trevor Nunn) – 18 November 1984 – 30 December 1984
 Cyrano de Bergerac (as original producer) – 16 October 1984 – 19 January 1985
 Much Ado About Nothing (as original producer) – 14 October 1984 – 16 January 1985
 All's Well that Ends Well  – 13 April 1983 – 15 May 1983
 Good (as original producer) – 13 October 1982 – 30 January 1983
 Cats – 7 October 1982 – 10 September 2000
 The Life and Adventures of Nicholas Nickleby – 4 October 1981 – 3 January 1982
 Piaf – 5 February 1981 – 28 June 1981
 London Assurance (as original producer) – 5 December 1974 – 12 January 1975
 Sherlock Holmes (as original producer) – 12 November 1974 – 4 January 1976
 Old Times (as original producer) – 16 November 1971 – 26 February 1972
 A Midsummer Night's Dream (as original producer) – 20 January 1971 – 13 March 1971

West End 
Source: Shakespeare Birthplace Trust
Fiddler on the Roof – 2019
Fatal Attraction – 2014
A Chorus of Disapproval – 2012
 The Lion in Winter – 2011
 Flare Path – 2011
 Birdsong – 2010
 Aspects of Love – 2010
 A Little Night Music – 2009
 Inherit The Wind – 2009
 Gone with the Wind – 2008
 King Lear – 2007
 The Seagull – 2007
 Porgy and Bess – 2006
 Acorn Antiques: The Musical! – 2005
 The Woman in White – 2004
 Anything Goes – 2002
 South Pacific – 2001
 My Fair Lady – 2001
 Oklahoma! – 1998
 Sunset Boulevard – 1993
 The Baker's Wife – 1989
 Aspects of Love – 1989
 Chess – 1986
 Les Misérables – 1985
 Starlight Express – 1984
 Cats – 1981

Film 
Source: Contemporary British and Irish Film Directors
 Hedda (director and adaptation) (1975)
 Lady Jane (director) (1986)
 Twelfth Night: Or What You Will (director and adaptation) (1996)
Red Joan (director) (2018)
 Prisoner C33 (2022)

Television 
 Every Good Boy Deserves Favour (1979)
 BBC2 Playhouse (TV series) – (1 episode, 1979)
 The Three Sisters (1981 TV movie)
 The Life and Adventures of Nicholas Nickleby (1982 TV mini-series)
 Othello (1990 TV movie)
 Porgy and Bess (1993 TV movie)
 Oklahoma! (1999 TV movie)
 The Merchant of Venice (2001 TV movie)
 King Lear (2008 TV Movie)

Awards and nominations 
Sources: Internet Broadway Database, Tony Awards Database (broadwayworld.com), Drama Desk History, Olivier Awards: Past Nominees and Winners
 1975 Drama Desk Award Unique Theatrical Experience – London Assurance [winner]
 1977 Laurence Olivier Award for Best Director – Macbeth [nominee]
 1979 Laurence Olivier Award for Best Director – Once in a Lifetime [nominee]
 1980 Laurence Olivier Award for Best Director –  The Life and Adventures of Nicholas Nickleby [winner]
 1981 Laurence Olivier Award for Best Director – Cats [nominee]
 1982 Tony Award for Best Direction of a Play – The Life and Adventures of Nicholas Nickleby [winner]
 1983 Drama Desk Award for Outstanding Director of a Play – All's Well that Ends Well [winner]
 1983 Tony Award for Best Direction of a Play – All's Well that Ends Well [nominee]
 1983 Tony Award for Best Direction of a Musical – Cats [winner]
 1987 Tony Award for Best Direction of a Musical – Les Misérables [winner]
 1987 Tony Award for Best Direction of a Musical – Starlight Express [nominee]
 1989 Laurence Olivier Award for Best Director – Othello [nominee]
 1990 Tony Award for Best Direction of a Musical – Aspects of Love [nominee]
 1994 Laurence Olivier Award for Best Director – Arcadia [nominee]
 1995 Drama Desk Award for Outstanding Director of a Musical – Sunset Boulevard [nominee]
 1995 Laurence Olivier Award for Best Director – The Merchant of Venice / Summerfolk [winner]
 1995 Tony Award for Best Direction of a Musical – Sunset Boulevard [nominee]
 1995 Golden Plate Award of the American Academy of Achievement
 1999 Drama Desk Award for Outstanding Director of a Play – Not About Nightingales [winner]
 1999 Tony Award for Best Direction of a Play – Not About Nightingales [nominee]
 1999 Laurence Olivier Award for Best Director – Oklahoma! [nominee]
 2000 Laurence Olivier Award for Best Director –  Summerfolk / The Merchant of Venice / Troilus and Cressida [winner]
 2001 Laurence Olivier Award for Best Director – The Cherry Orchard [nominee]
 2002 Laurence Olivier Award for Outstanding Achievement
 2002 Drama Desk Award for Outstanding Director of a Musical – Oklahoma! [nominee]
 2002 Tony Award for Best Direction of a Musical – Oklahoma! [nominee]
 2012 Induction into the American Theater Hall of Fame
 2020 Laurence Olivier Award for Best Director – Fiddler on the Roof [nominee]

References

Further reading 
 Trowbridge, Simon: The Company: A Biographical Dictionary of the Royal Shakespeare Company, Editions Albert Creed (2010)

External links 
 
 
 Scenes from a Marriage preview
 Michael Jackson's Peter Pan obsession – by Trevor Nunn 2009

1940 births
Alumni of Downing College, Cambridge
Commanders of the Order of the British Empire
English film directors
English theatre directors
Fellows of Downing College, Cambridge
Fellows of St Catherine's College, Oxford
Knights Bachelor
Living people
Laurence Olivier Award winners
People from Ipswich
People educated at Northgate Grammar School, Ipswich